City of Legions may refer to:

Caerleon in Monmouthshire, Wales
Chester in Cheshire, England
León in Castilla y León, Spain